The Air Tractor AT-300 is a family of agricultural aircraft that first flew in the United States on September 1973. Type certification was awarded to Air Tractor in November the same year, and serial production commenced in 1976. Of low-wing monoplane taildragger configuration, they carry a chemical hopper between the engine firewall and the cockpit.

Variants
 AT-300 - prototype and early production models with Pratt & Whitney R-985 engine and 320 US gal (1,200 L) hopper
 AT-301 - main production model with Pratt & Whitney R-1340 engine
 AT-301B - AT-301 with 350 US gal (1,320 L) hopper
 AT-302 - turboprop version with Lycoming LTP101 engine
 AT-302A - AT-302 with 385 US gal (1,460 L) hopper

Specifications (AT-301A)

References

Notes

Bibliography

External links

 Specs and photo on Flugzeuginfo.net

AT-300
1970s United States agricultural aircraft
Single-engined tractor aircraft
Low-wing aircraft
Aircraft first flown in 1973
Conventional landing gear